Hellenica simply means writings on Greek (Hellenic) subjects. Several histories of 4th-century Greece, written in the mould of Thucydides or straying from it, have borne the conventional Latin title Hellenica. The surviving Hellenica is an important work of the Ancient Greek writer Xenophon and one of the principal sources for the last seven years of the Peloponnesian War not covered by Thucydides, as well as the war's aftermath.

Xenophon's Hellenica 

Many consider this a very personal work, written by Xenophon in retirement on his Spartan estate, intended primarily for circulation among his friends, for people who knew the main protagonists and events, often because they had participated in them.  Xenophon's account starts in 411 BC, the year where Thucydides breaks off, and ends in 362 BC, the year of the Battle of Mantineia. There is virtually no transition between the two works, to the extent that the opening words of Hellenica, μετὰ δὲ ταῦτα, are translated as After this, or sometimes Following these events.

Summary
Xenophon's Hellenica is a Classical Greek historical narrative divided into seven books that describe Greco-Persian history in the years 411–362 BC. The first two books narrate the final years of the Peloponnesian War from the moment at which Thucydides' history ends. The remaining books, three to seven, focus primarily on Sparta as the dominant city-state in Greece after the Peloponnesian War; continuing into the period known as the Theban hegemony following Sparta's defeat at the battle of Leuctra. Scholars believe the first two books were written at a much earlier time when Xenophon was still living in Athens; while books three to seven were written after Xenophon was banished from Athens and lived in Sparta. The work ends with a summation by Xenophon that his history has ended but another historian may continue it. The Hellenica is the only primary source for the period from the end of the Peloponnesian War until the time of Alexander. Xenophon was familiar with the leading political figures in Sparta and witnessed many battles and expeditions described in the Hellenica. The work is noteworthy as the only major primary historical source between the golden age of Athens and the rise of Macedon.

The Hellenica narrative begins as a continuation of Thucydides' unfinished History of the Peloponnesian War. It is alleged Xenophon was the editor of Thucydides' works after his death. This allowed Xenophon directly to continue the narration. Book 1 covers the "Decelian War" period of the Peloponnesian War in the years 411–406 BC. The rival navies of Sparta and Athens fight campaigns in the Hellespont region. Initially, the Athenian navy saw several major sea victories. Book one also narrates restoration of Alcibiades to the Athenian military and his return to Athens in 407 BC.

Book 2 narrates the years 406–402 BC and the end of the Peloponnesian War with the surrender of Athens in 404 BC. The Spartan commander Lysander ordered the long walls of Athens torn down, and Athens became formally allied with the Spartan hegemony. The Spartans also installed a new government. Book 2 focuses primarily on the internal politics of Athens following the war. The Spartan-instituted oligarch regime, known as the Thirty Tyrants' regime, was overthrown and there was a resumption of democracy in Athens.

Book 3 shifts viewpoint from Athenian to Spartan politics, covering the years 401–395 BC. Book 3 starts with a brief account of the expedition of the Ten-thousand against the Persian king Artaxerxes II. For a further description of this, see Xenophon's Anabasis. Book 3 narrates the Spartan expedition led by King Agesilaus in Asia Minor against the Persians. The satraps of Ionia, Pharnabazus and Tissaphernes, are prominent characters with shifting allegiances throughout the Hellenica.

Book 4 narrates events of 395–388 BC, and is primarily concerned with the Corinthian War. Book 4 recalls King Agesilaus' Ionian campaign against Persia of 396–395 BC. During this time, the satrap Pharnabazus bribed Greek states into revolting against Sparta. This eventually led to the Corinthian War, with the states of Athens, Corinth, Argos and Thebes united against Sparta. Agesilaus and his army were recalled in 394 BC from his campaign against Persia. This period saw the beginning of the Corinthian War, with the Persian Empire siding with Athens against Sparta. The Persian satrap Pharnabazus let the exiled Athenian general Conon lead the Persian navy in a number of battles, including the Battle of Cnidus in 394 BC. Conon then convinced Pharnabazus to allow Athens to keep the Persian fleet and to fund the rebuilding of the long walls at Athens.

Book 5 covers the years 388–374 BC. There is a peace conference at the end of the Corinthian War in 387 BC that results in a treaty called the "King's Peace". The acropolis in Thebes is seized by the supposed renegade Spartan Phoebidas, enabling Sparta to control the city until 378 BC, when a group of Thebans expelled the Spartans and reclaimed the city. This later led to the Boeotian War from 378–372 BC.

Book 6 describes events during the years 374–370 BC. The Athenian general Iphicrates stealthily travels around the Peloponnesus. The Battle of Leuctra results in a major loss for Sparta against Thebes, ending the Boeotian War and Spartan hegemony in Greece, although Sparta would remain influential over the next decade. Theban hegemony begins under the leadership of Theban general Epaminondas.

Book 7 narrates the years 370–362 BC. During this period Thebes was the ascendant power in Greece. The old power structures fluctuated as new ones came into being. There was briefly an alliance between Athens and Sparta against Thebes. Sparta faced increasing harassment from internal rebellions and outside resistance. The Spartan homeland saw the first invasion in centuries. The Theban hegemony ended in 362 BC with the second battle of Mantinea.

Other works titled Hellenica
Among competing works under this title, now lost, two stand out, that written by Ephorus of Cyme and that by Theopompus of Chios. Ephorus attempted a universal history, and though he attempted to set apart history from myth, he began his work with the legendary "Return of the sons of Heracles", which modern readers understand as wholly mythic aitia. As a pupil of the rhetorician Isocrates he was not above embroidering his narrative with believable circumstantial detail. Oswyn Murray remarked, "His style and completeness, unfortunately, made him rather popular, but at least he stands out as one who had thought about the purposes that history should serve, and got them wrong." The Hellenica of Theopompus, another pupil of Isocrates, was a continuation of Thucydides.

There is evidence that Anaximenes of Lampsacus wrote a Hellenica.

Yet another, fragmentary Hellenica found in papyrus at Oxyrhynchus, is known as Hellenica Oxyrhynchia; it covered events from 411 to the year of the Battle of Cnidus, 395/4 BC.  It has been tentatively attributed to several historians.

See also 
 Papyrus Oxyrhynchus 28

Notes

External links 

 Project Gutenberg – Hellenica by Xenophon

Works by Xenophon
Historiography of Greece
4th-century BC history books